Kilbride Castle, also known as Comyn's Castle, was a castle that was located to the north of East Kilbride, South Lanarkshire, Scotland.

The castle was owned by the de Valognes family, until the castle passed by marriage of Isabel de Valognes to David Comyn in the 13th century. After the Comyns' lands were confiscated by King Robert I of Scotland, the castle and lands were granted to Walter Stewart. King Robert II of Scotland granted the lands to John Lindsay of Dunrod in 1382.

With the construction of nearby Mains Castle in the 15th century, Kilbride Castle fell into disrepair and was abandoned.

Citations

References
 Young, Alan; "Robert the Bruce's Rivals: The Comyns, 1212-1314", Tuckwell Press, 1997, 9781862320536

Castles in South Lanarkshire
Buildings and structures in East Kilbride
Demolished buildings and structures in Scotland
Former castles in Scotland
Clan Comyn
House of Stuart
Clan Lindsay
De Valognes family